Neococcyx mccorquodalei is a prehistoric bird, known from postcranial remains from the late Eocene (Chadronian) of Canada.

References

Eocene birds